Jonathan Williams is a Canadian web series creator, writer and director.

Career 
Williams created, writes, and directs the Independent Production Fund-backed web series Riftworld Chronicles, based on the short film The Portal, which has won numerous awards including Best Canadian Series at the 2016 Vancouver Web Series Festival and a Canadian Screen Award nomination for Best Original Series Produced for Digital Media.

References

Canadian film directors
Canadian television directors
Living people
Year of birth missing (living people)